Oleh Mykolayovych Naduda (born 23 February 1971) is a Ukrainian professional football coach and a former player.

Club career
He made his debut in the Russian Premier League in 1994 for FC Spartak Moscow. He played 3 games in the 1994–95 UEFA Champions League for FC Spartak Moscow.

Honours
 Russian Premier League champion: 1994.

International career
He played his only game for the Ukraine national football team on 26 April 1995 in a UEFA Euro 1996 qualifier against Estonia.

References

1971 births
Footballers from Kyiv
Living people
Soviet footballers
Ukrainian footballers
Ukrainian expatriate footballers
Ukraine international footballers
FC Spartak Moscow players
Maccabi Herzliya F.C. players
Expatriate footballers in Israel
Ukrainian football managers
Expatriate footballers in Russia
Russian Premier League players
Liga Leumit players
Israeli Premier League players
FC Nyva Vinnytsia players
Ukrainian expatriate sportspeople in Russia
Association football midfielders
FC Arsenal Bila Tserkva managers
FC Spartak-2 Moscow players
FC Epitsentr Dunaivtsi